Disphragis disvirens is a moth of the family Notodontidae. It is found in north-eastern Ecuador.

The length of the forewings is 17.5–19 mm. The ground colour of the forewings is straw-coloured to golden brown with diffuse areas of grey scales located near the base. The ground colour of the hindwings is white.

Etymology
The species name is derived from Latin dis (meaning without) and viridis (meaning green) and refers to the wings of the species, which lack the green scaling of related species Disphragis albovirens.

References

Moths described in 2011
Notodontidae